Tokitsukaze may refer to:

Japanese destroyer Tokitsukaze
Tokitsukaze stable, a stable of sumo wrestlers
Yutakayama Katsuo (born 1937), former head of the stable 1969–2002
Futatsuryū Jun'ichi (1950–2014), former head of the stable 2002–2007
Tokitsuumi Masahiro (born 1973), present Tokitsukaze-oyakata and current head of the stable